Sympathy for the Lobster is a 2007 Italian mockumentary film written, directed and starred by Sabina Guzzanti. The film premiered out of competition at the 64th Venice International Film Festival.

Cast 

Sabina Guzzanti
Pierfrancesco Loche
Francesca Reggiani
Cinzia Leone
Antonello Fassari
Stefano Masciarelli
Renato Soru

Awards
 Brian Award at the 64th Venice International Film Festival.

References

External links

2007 films
Films directed by Sabina Guzzanti
Italian comedy films
2007 comedy films
2000s mockumentary films
Films set in Sardinia
Fandango (Italian company) films